Jack Marks (12 February 1895 – 12 March 1987) was an English performer and screenwriter. He was born in Leeds, West Yorkshire, and began his career as a comedian, dancer and singer. He appeared before King George V and Queen Mary at the inaugural Royal Command Performance in London in 1912. He later became a successful screenwriter for several British films, such as Up for the Cup (1950).

Marks married Iris Dilley and they had a son, Howard.

He died from lung cancer in St John's Wood.

Selected filmography

 Splinters in the Navy (1931)
 The Mayor's Nest (1932)
 This Week of Grace (1933)
 It's a King (1933)
 Trouble (1933)
 Up for the Derby (1933)
 It's a Cop (1934)
 Girls, Please! (1934)

 Where's George? (1935)
 Fame (1936)
 Splinters in the Air (1937)
 Why Pick on Me? (1937)
 What a Man! (1938)
 Old Mother Riley Joins Up (1940)
 Old Mother Riley's New Venture (1949)
 Trail Blazers (1953)
 Not Wanted on Voyage (1957)

External links
 

1895 births
1987 deaths
English male screenwriters
English male comedians
Writers from Leeds
20th-century English comedians
Comedians from Yorkshire
20th-century English screenwriters
20th-century English male writers